Will Green may refer to:

Will Green (rugby union) (born 1973), English rugby union player
Will Greene or A. Wilson Greene (born 1949), American historian
Will S. Green (1832–1905), American pioneer

See also
William Green (disambiguation)
Willie Green (disambiguation)
Bill Green (disambiguation)